"Water into Wine" is a song by Australian rock band Cold Chisel. It was released in December 1998 as the second single from their sixth studio album, The Last Wave of Summer. 
The song peaked at number 46 in Australia.

Biographer Michael Lawrence said, "From very early on its lifetime, this song was touted as a possible single. A catchy ballad that sees acoustic guitar appearing in a Cold Chisel song for the first time since "Khe Sanh"."

Before its release, industry figures such as Denis Handlin and Michael Gudinski felt the single would be very successful. However, Kevin Shirley, when mixing, said, "It's a straightforward song to mix and it would make a good b-side. It's not a single. It drags."

Track listing
CD single (MUSH01844.2)
 "Water into Wine"	
 "A Better Time, A Better Place"	
 "This Time Round"	
 "Child of Mine"

Charts

References

Cold Chisel songs
1998 songs
1998 singles
Mushroom Records singles